Kémobé Djirmassal (born February 26, 1954) is a track and field athlete who competed in the long jump internationally for Chad.

Djirmassal represented Chad at the 1984 Summer Olympics in Los Angeles, in his long jump qualifying group he jumped 7.37 metres and finished 8th in the group and 17th overall and therefore he did not reach the final.

References

1954 births
Athletes (track and field) at the 1984 Summer Olympics
Olympic athletes of Chad
Living people
Male long jumpers
Chadian long jumpers
Chadian male athletes